Robinson Road is a road in the Mid-Levels, Hong Kong Island, Hong Kong. In the east, it is connected with the Magazine Gap Road and Garden Road, and in the west with Babington Path and Park Road. 

An escalator connecting the Central to Mid-Levels areas crosses between Mosque Street and Conduit Road, below which Robinson Road runs parallel. 

As early as the 1870s, Robinson Road had an enviable reputation, housing the European upper-middle class of its time. The area is one of the most affluent in Hong Kong.

Historic Ohel Leah Synagogue is located on the northern side of the western end of the street.  

Robinson Road is largely residential and, in keeping with area, lined with high-rises. There are a number of property agents located along the road.

Naming 
It was named after the fifth Governor of Hong Kong, Sir Hercules Robinson. 

Nathan Road in Kowloon, where Bruce Lee was a resident, was also called Robinson Road until 1907. The road was subsequently renamed to avoid confusion with its Mid-Levels counterpart.

Famous residents
Notable residents include actor/singer/entrepreneur Edison Chen and actress Bernice Liu.

Wall trees 
Some of Hong Kong's 1,000 "wall trees" can be found on Robinson Road by the Mid-Levels escalator.

Parts of the walls in Robinson Road have been recently declared protected monuments.

See also
 List of streets and roads in Hong Kong

External links

Google Maps of Robinson Road

Sources 

Mid-Levels
Roads on Hong Kong Island